The 2016–17 Top League is the 14th season of Japan's domestic rugby union competition, the Top League. It kicked off on 26 August 2016 and the final round of league matches were played on 14 January 2017.

Teams

The only change to the make-up of the league was the Challenge One winner Munakata Sanix Blues replacing NTT DoCoMo Red Hurricanes.

Competition

The regular season saw all 16 teams competing in a round-robin style tournament where they played each team in the league once.

Unlike previous seasons, there were no title-play-offs, and the team on top of the league after the round-robin stages was crowned the champion. The top three teams progressed to the 54th All Japan Rugby Football Championship.

Standings

 Honda Heat were relegated to the new second-tier Top Challenge League.

Matches

The following matches were played during the 2016–17 Top League competition:

Round 1

Round 2

Round 3

Round 4

Round 5

Round 6

Round 7

Round 8

Round 9

Round 10

Round 11

Round 12

Round 13

Round 14

Round 15

Top League Challenge Series

Hino Red Dolphins, Kyuden Voltex and Mitsubishi Sagamihara DynaBoars progressed to the promotion play-offs.

Promotion/relegation play-offs

At the end of the season, there were three promotion/relegation play-offs for three places in the 2017–18 Top League. The teams ranked 13th, 14th and 15th in the Top League played off against the teams ranked 2nd, 3rd and 4th in the Top League Challenge 1.

Coca-Cola Red Sparks, Kintetsu Liners and Toyota Industries Shuttles qualified from the Top League relegation play-off zone, while Hino Red Dolphins, Kyuden Voltex and Mitsubishi Sagamihara DynaBoars qualified from Challenge 1.

The following matches were played in the series:

 Coca-Cola Red Sparks, Kintetsu Liners and Toyota Industries Shuttles remain in the Top League for the 2017–18 season.
 Hino Red Dolphins, Kyuden Voltex and Mitsubishi Sagamihara DynaBoars qualify to the second-tier Top Challenge League for the 2017–18 season.

References

Japan Rugby League One
Top League
Top League